John Marriott Kynoch (born 18 March 1933) is a sport shooter who competed for Great Britain. He won the bronze medal in running game target at the 1972 Summer Olympics in Munich.

Born and raised in New Zealand, Marriott was educated at Huntley School from 1941 to 1946 and Nelson College between 1947 and 1950. He did a short course at Massey Agricultural College before emigrating to Banffshire, Scotland in the early 1950s to work in the family woollen mill.

References

External links

1933 births
Living people
Shooters at the 1972 Summer Olympics
Olympic medalists in shooting
Olympic bronze medallists for Great Britain
ISSF rifle shooters
British male sport shooters
Olympic shooters of Great Britain
People educated at Nelson College
Massey University alumni
New Zealand emigrants to the United Kingdom
Medalists at the 1972 Summer Olympics
20th-century British people